LOCAL 9 is a Spanish hard rock band formed by drummer Julio JJ in July 2006.  In February 2008, bass player David Marqués joined the band, in July 2011 José Luis Galán (rhythm guitar) joined the band, in November 2014 guitar player David Tormo and later in January 2015 vocalist Miki complete the current lineup.

In 2011 they recorded an EP and in 2013 recorded their first CD, which included a recording with Chinese voices of their songs "sólo puedo anidar en ti" and "imposible".

 
 

 
In late 2012 they recorded a video with the director David X Myers,

In November 2013 they joined forces with José Andrëa, ex-lead singer of Spanish folk-rock band Mago de Oz, to record a new version of their song "Sólo puedo anidar en ti" in Chinese/Spanish.

Members 
 David Tormo - Lead guitar
 JJ - Drums
 David Marqués - Bass guitar
 José Luis Galán - Rhythm guitar
 Miki - voice

Discography

Albums and EPs
2011 - Pacto de Diablos (EP)
2013 - LOCAL 9
2014 - Juntos pero Revueltos

References

External links 
 Official website.

Spanish rock music groups